Sir Thomas Style, 2nd Baronet (1624–1702) was an English politician who sat in the House of Commons  between 1656 and 1659.

Style was the son of Sir Thomas Style, 1st Baronet of Wateringbury, Kent and his wife Elizabeth Foulkes daughter of Robert Foulkes of Monchesning, Essex. His father was High Sheriff of Kent in 1634.

In 1656, Style was elected Member of Parliament for Kent in the Second Protectorate Parliament. He was re-elected MP for Kent in the Third Protectorate Parliament. 
 
Style died at the age of  78.

Style married firstly Elizabeth Airmine, daughter of Sir William Airmine, 1st Baronet and secondly Margaret Twisden, daughter of Sir Thomas Twisden, 1st Baronet. He was succeeded by his son Oliver by his first wife who died a few months after. Oliver was succeeded by his half-brother Thomas.

References

1624 births
1702 deaths
Baronets in the Baronetage of England
English MPs 1656–1658
English MPs 1659
People from Wateringbury